Bertina Henrichs (born 1966, Frankfurt am Main) is a German writer who writes in French and lives in Paris.

Life 
Bertina Henrichs studied literature and film techniques in Berlin and France. With a thesis on writers who have adopted a foreign language in exile, she obtained her PhD in 1997 at Paris Diderot University. She lived in Paris from then on and wrote several screenplays, before making her debut as a writer in 2005 with the novel La Joueuse d'échecs. The story about a maid who discovered her passion for chess became a bestseller and appeared shortly after in 2007 under the title  Die Schachspielerin selling something more than 50,000 copies.

Bertina Henrichs has been a recipient of the Cezam Prix Littéraire Inter CE in 2003 and of the Corine Literature Prize in 2006.

Works 
2005: La Joueuse d’échecs
2008: That's all right mama
2010: Le Narcisse
2011: Le jardin
2013: Das Glück der blauen Stunde. Hoffmann und Campe, Hamburg 2013, .

References

External links 
 
 
 Verlagsinfos zu Autorin und Werk bei Hoffmann und Campe
 
 Schach den tradierten Rollenmustern, Interview with Bertina Henrichs on chessbase.de

German women writers
Writers from Frankfurt
1966 births
Living people